The American University in Cairo Press (AUCP, AUC Press) is the leading English-language publisher in the Middle East.

The largest translator of Arabic literature in the world, AUC Press has a reputation for carefully selecting and translating the best writing being produced in the language today. They are the publisher of the Nobel prize winning Egyptian novelist, Naguib Mahfouz.

The press is currently a member of the Association of University Presses.

History
 
The American University in Cairo Press was founded in 1960. It is an independent publisher with close ties to the American University in Cairo (AUC). Its offices are in the heart of the Egyptian capital, overlooking the historic downtown landmark, Tahrir Square.

Its first publications in 1961 were K.A.C. Creswell’s A Bibliography of the Architecture, Arts and Crafts of Islam, (AUC Press, 1961), Otto F.A. Meinardus’s Monks and Monasteries of the Egyptian Deserts (AUC Press, 1961), Edward B. Savage's The Rose and the Vine: A Study of the Evolution of the Tristan and Isolt Tale in Drama (AUC Press, 1961), and George Scanlon’s A Muslim Manual of War (AUC Press, 1961).

Mission

Considered "the leading English-language publishing house in the Middle East", its goals and purposes reflect and support the mission of the AUC in education, research, and cultural exchange, through professional publishing programs and international bookselling services.

Originally an academic publisher, AUC Press now publishes Arabic fiction translated into English. In 2016, AUC Press launched a new fiction imprint called Hoopoe.

Publishing programs

Today the AUC Press publishes books in twelve broad categories:
 
 Arabic Language Learning
 Archaeology and Ancient Egypt
 Art & Architecture 
 Business, Economics, and Environmental Studies
 Coptic and Islamic Studies
 Egypt Guidebooks
 Fiction in Translation
 History
 Literary Criticism
 Middle East Studies
 Middle East Travel
 Naguib Mahfouz

It publishes annually up to 50 wide-ranging academic texts and general interest books for distribution worldwide.  It also maintains a backlist of more than 600 high-quality scholarly, literary, and general interest publications. Through its own bookstores and other retailers in Egypt, along with its distributors abroad, namely Ingram Content Group and Bloomsbury Publishing, the AUC Press sells its books in every major book market around the world and through major online retailers, including Amazon. The AUC Press also sells e-books and licenses foreign editions of its publications in many languages.

Fiction in Translation

In 1978 the AUC Press translated and published a novel, Naguib Mahfouz's Miramar―his first to be translated into English―thereby launching its new Arabic Fiction in Translation program. Today it is a leader in the translation, distribution, and promotion of the best in modern Arabic fiction, bringing over 145 Arabic fiction titles by more than 65 authors from 12 countries, to English-speaking readers, including  works of the late Nobel laureate Naguib Mahfouz and internationally acclaimed author Alaa Al Aswany.

Naguib Mahfouz

In December 1985, three years before Naguib Mahfouz won the Nobel Prize for Literature, the AUC Press signed a comprehensive publishing agreement with the Egyptian writer, thus becoming his primary English-language publisher as well as his worldwide agent for all translation rights, publishing all of his novels in English and licensing numerous editions in other languages. His most translated novel, Midaq Alley, has appeared in more than 30 foreign editions in 15 languages.

Since it first introduced Mahfouz's novels in English, the AUC Press has published 43 volumes of his writing, including a collection of his Life’s Wisdom, an anthology of his thought and philosophy, Heart of the Night (2011) and Love in the Rain (2011). The AUC Press has also licensed some 600 foreign-language editions of Mahfouz's works in 40 languages.

The Naguib Mahfouz Medal for Literature

As a tribute to the acclaimed Egyptian writer and the rich literary heritage of the region, in 1996 the AUC Press established the Naguib Mahfouz Medal for Literature, a major award in support of contemporary Arabic literature in translation.

The award, consisting of a silver medal and a cash prize, as well as the translation and publication of the winning novel throughout the English-speaking world, is presented annually on 11 December, the birthday of Naguib Mahfouz.

Winners of the Naguib Mahfouz Medal for Literature

The 24 winners of the Naguib Mahfouz Medal for Literature so far include 10 women, 14 men; 12 Egyptians (2 posthumously), 3 Palestinians, 1 Algerian, 2 Lebanese, 1 Moroccan, 2 Syrians, 1 Iraqi, 1 Sudanese, and 1 Saudi Arabian.

Previous winners

 1996: Ibrahim Abdel Meguid, The Other Place; and Latifa al-Zayyat, The Open Door
 1997: Mourid Barghouti, I Saw Ramallah; and Yusuf Idris, City of Love and Ashes
 1998: Ahlam Mosteghanemi, Memory in the Flesh
 1999: Edwar al-Kharrat, Rama and the Dragon
 2000: Hoda Barakat, The Tiller of Waters
 2001: Somaya Ramadan, Leaves of Narcissus
 2002: Bensalem Himmich, The Polymath
 2003: Khairy Shalaby, The Lodging House
 2004: Alia Mamdouh, The Loved Ones
 2005: Yusuf Abu Rayya, Wedding Night
 2006: Sahar Khalifeh, The Image, the Icon, and the Covenant
 2007: Amina Zaydan, Red Wine
 2008: Hamdi Abu Golayyel, A Dog with No Tail
 2009: Khalil Sweileh, The Scribe of Love
 2010: Miral al-Tahawy, Brooklyn Heights
 2011: Awarded to "the revolutionary creativity of the Egyptian people"
 2012: Ezzat el Kamhawi, House of the Wolf
 2013: Khaled Khalifa, No Knives in this City's Kitchens
 2014: Hammour Ziada, Shawq al-darwish (The Longing of the Dervish)
 2015: Hassan Daoud, La Tareeq Ila Al-Jannah ('No Road to Paradise')
 2016: Adel Esmat, Hikayat Yusuf Tadrus ('The Tales of Yusuf Tadrus', 'حكايات يوسف تادرس')
 2017: Huzama Habayeb, Velvet 'مُخْمَل'
 2018: Omaima Al-Khamis, Voyage of the Cranes in the Cities of Agate

Arabic Language Learning

With an expanding collection of more than 30 textbooks for class and self-learning, such as the frequently-used Media Arabic and the Kallimni ‘Arabi series, the AUC Press also has one of the largest selection of Arabic-language textbooks for students of Modern Standard Arabic and Egyptian Arabic.

Book Awards

The following AUC Press publications won awards:

Moon over Samarqand, a novel by Mohamed Mansi Qandil, translated by Jennifer Peterson (2009), the original Arabic edition won the 2006 Sawiris Foundation Award for Literature

The Lodging House, a novel by Khairy Shalaby (2008), translated by Farouk Mustafa (pen-name Farouk Abdel Wahab), winner of the 2007 Saif Ghobash‒Banipal Prize for Arabic Literary Translation Prize

Desert Songs: A Woman Explorer in Egypt and Sudan by Arita Baaijens (2008), nominated best photo travel book of 2008 by Dutch travel bookshops

The Collar and the Bracelet, a novel by Yahya Taher Abdullah (AUC Press, 2008), translated by Samah Selim, winner of the 2009 Saif Ghobash–Banipal Prize for Arabic Literary Translation

Cities without Palms, a novel by Tarek Eltayeb (AUC Press, 2009), translated by Kareem James Abu-Zeid,  runner-up of the 2010 Saif Ghobash–Banipal Prize for Arabic Literary Translation

Specters, a novel by Radwa Ashour (AUC Press, 2010), translated by Barbara Romaine, runner-up of the 2011 Saif Ghobash‒Banipal Prize for Arabic Literary Translation

Ancient Nubia: African Kingdoms on the Nile (2012), “Best Archaeology & Anthropology Book,” PROSE Award by the Association of American Publishers.

E-books
 
Since 2012, the AUC Press made available five backlist titles in electronic format: A Muslim Manual of War by George Scanlon, Islamic History through Coins: An Analysis and Catalogue of Tenth-Century Ikhshidid Coinage by Jere L. Bacharach, Al-Fustat: Its Foundation and Early Urban Development by Wladyslaw B. Kubiak, Ayyubid Cairo: A Topographical Study by Neil D. MacKenzie, and Writing Egypt: History, Literature, and Culture, edited by Aleya Serour. Today, it offers a large selection of e-books―new and backlist titles, ranging from Arabic fiction to travel books.

See also

List of university presses

References
A Complete Bibliography 1960-2010 (AUC Press, 2010) http://dar.aucegypt.edu/handle/10526/3018
CairoBookStop
Naguib Mahfouz - Nobel Prize for Literature – 1988

External links
 AUC Press https://aucpress.com/
 Bloomsbury Publishing https://www.bloomsbury.com/uk/
 Ingram Content Group https://www.ingramacademic.com/

1960 establishments in Egypt
Book publishing companies of Egypt
Publishing companies established in 1960
University presses of Egypt
Mass media in Cairo
The American University in Cairo